Olga Turchak (born 5 March 1967) is a retired female high jumper born in Almaty, Kazakhstan.

Biography
Turchak set her personal best on 7 July 1986, jumping 2.01 metres at a meet in Moscow. She competed at two  Olympic Games, reaching the final on both occasions. In Seoul 1988, she finished in fourth place with 1.96 m, while in Barcelona 1992, she finished thirteenth with 1.83m, having cleared 1.92 m in the qualifying round. Turchak set the Youth World Best Performance on September 7, 1984 in Donetsk, with a jump of 1.96 metres.

International competitions
All results regarding high jump

See also
List of world youth bests in athletics
List of world junior records in athletics

External links
 IAAF site
 
 Women's World All-Time List

Soviet female high jumpers
Kazakhstani female high jumpers
Athletes (track and field) at the 1988 Summer Olympics
Athletes (track and field) at the 1992 Summer Olympics
Olympic athletes of the Soviet Union
Olympic athletes of the Unified Team
1967 births
Living people
Sportspeople from Almaty
European Athletics Championships medalists
Goodwill Games medalists in athletics
CIS Athletics Championships winners
Competitors at the 1986 Goodwill Games